Amr Emad Naguib (born  18 May 1994), known as Amr El Sisi, is an Egyptian professional footballer who plays as a midfielder for Egyptian Premier League club Zamalek.

References

Egyptian footballers
Living people
1994 births
Zamalek SC players